María Julia Merino García (born 3 March 1971 in Valladolid) is a retired Spanish sprinter who specialised in the 400 metres. She represented her country at the 1992 Summer Olympics and 1991 World Championships. In addition she won the gold medal at the 1991 Mediterranean Games.

Her personal bests in the event are 51.82 seconds outdoors (Tokyo 1991) and 52.22 seconds indoors (Genoa 1992).

Competition record

References

1971 births
Living people
Sportspeople from Valladolid
Spanish female sprinters
Olympic athletes of Spain
Athletes (track and field) at the 1992 Summer Olympics
World Athletics Championships athletes for Spain
Mediterranean Games gold medalists for Spain
Mediterranean Games medalists in athletics
Athletes (track and field) at the 1991 Mediterranean Games
Olympic female sprinters